Coombs is a surname.

Coombs may also refer to:

Coombs, British Columbia, a small community in British Columbia, Canada
Coombs Lake, a lake in Minnesota

See also
 Coombs test, a test for the presence of antibodies or antigens
 Coombs reagent, the reagent used in the Coombs test
 Coombs' method, a type of voting designed by the psychologist Clyde Coombs
 Coombes, a village and civil parish in the Adur District of West Sussex, England
 Coombe (disambiguation)
 Combs (disambiguation)
 Coomes (disambiguation)